Ross Donnelly Mangles (1801 – 1877) was an English politician, Member of Parliament for Guildford between 1841 and 1857. In the latter year he became Chairman of the East India Company.

Career and appointments
He was the son of James Mangles of Guildford and his wife Mary, and was educated at Eton College and East India College, Haileybury. He then joined the Bengal Civil Service.

Secretary to the Government of Bengal in the Judicial and Revenue Departments.

Deputy Lieutenant of London.

A director of the New Zealand Co.

Member for Council of India in September 1858 to 1866

Publications
A brief vindication of the Honourable East India Company's government of Bengal, from the attacks of Messrs. Rickards & Crawfurd (1830) 
How To Colonize: The Interest Of The Country, And The Duty Of The Government (1842)
The Mysore Reversion, An Exceptional Case
Christian Reasons of a Member of the Church of England for Being a Reformer
Notes on a Minute of Mr. R. D. Mangles in the Mysore Parliamentary Papers, no. 112 of 1866

Family
Ross Lowis Mangles V.C. was his son.

References

People educated at Eton College
British East India Company
Directors of the British East India Company
British East India Company people
British Indian history
Members of the Parliament of the United Kingdom for English constituencies
UK MPs 1841–1847
UK MPs 1847–1852
UK MPs 1852–1857
1801 births
1877 deaths